Bouché may refer to:

People
 Auguste Bouché-Leclercq (1842–1923), French historian
 Carl David Bouché (1809–1881), German botanist and gardener
 Claudine Bouché (1925–2014), French film editor
 Donatien Bouché (1882–1965), French Olympic sailor
 Louis Bouché (1896–1969), American muralist
 Peter Friedrich Bouché (1785–1856), German botanist and entomologist, uncle of Carl David
 René Bouché (c. 1905–1963), artist and fashion illustrator

Music
 A French term for hand stopping

See also
 Bonne Bouche, a type of goat cheese
 La Bouche, German-American dance music duo